Binyamin Arditi (1 July 1897 – 20 May 1981) was an Israeli politician who served as a member of the Knesset for Herut and Gahal between 1955 and 1965.

Biography
Born in Vienna, Arditi attended high school in Sofia in Bulgaria. In 1917 he became a member of the central committee of the Zionist Organization of Bulgaria, on which he remained until 1923. He also chaired the organisation's Sofia branch. In 1925 he established the first Bulgarian Revisionist Zionist movement, which he chaired until 1935.

In 1944 he was arrested for Zionist activities, and two years later was arrested again by the communist authorities for encouraging emigration to Palestine. Between 1947 and 1949 he served as the Revisionist Zionism representative in the Bulgarian Eretz Yisrael Office.

In 1949 he made aliyah to Israel, where he became a member of the Herut central committee. In 1955 he was elected to the Knesset on the party's list, and was re-elected in 1959 and 1961, before losing his seat in the 1965 elections.

Arditi also published several books; The Role of King Boris in the Expulsion of Bulgarian Jewry (1952), Bulgarian Jews Under the Nazis (1962), Bulgarian Jewry – the Sumla Community (1968) and Famous Bulgarian Jews (1971).

He died in 1981 at the age of 83.

References

External links 
 

1897 births
1981 deaths
Austrian Sephardi Jews
Austro-Hungarian emigrants to Bulgaria
Bulgarian Jews in Israel
Bulgarian Sephardi Jews
Bulgarian Zionists
Zionist activists
Bulgarian emigrants to Israel
Israeli non-fiction writers
Herut politicians
Gahal politicians
Israeli Sephardi Jews
Members of the 3rd Knesset (1955–1959)
Members of the 4th Knesset (1959–1961)
Members of the 5th Knesset (1961–1965)
20th-century non-fiction writers